Leucanella janeira is a species of moth in the family Saturniidae first described by John O. Westwood in 1854. It is found in South America, including Brazil.

References

Moths described in 1854
Hemileucinae